The Chief Minister, Treasury and Economic Development Directorate (CMTEDD) is a directorate of the Australian Capital Territory government, which advises the ACT Chief Minister, currently Andrew Barr.

History
The directorate originated from a few defunct separate directorates, mainly the Chief Minister and Cabinet Directorate (CMCD), Treasury Directorate and the Economic Development Directorate (EDD). These directorates were created on 17 May 2011 after Katy Gallagher was elected by the Legislative Assembly as Chief Minister the day before.

The original directorates

Chief Minister and Cabinet Directorate
Prior to May 2011, the Chief Minister and Cabinet Directorate (CMCD) was previously known as the Chief Minister's Department.  At the time, the department provided leadership and advice to all ACT government departments for the planning, development, co-ordination and implementation of key government policies and strategies.

The administrative arrangements in May 2011 resulted in:
 renaming of Chief Minister’s Department to the Chief Minister and Cabinet Directorate (CMCD)
 transferring Business and Industry Development, Australian Capital Tourism, Live in Canberra and Special Events to the Economic Development Directorate (EDD)
 transferring Heritage and the Government Architect to the Environment and Sustainable Development Directorate (ESDD)
 transferring artsACT to the Community Services Directorate
 renaming of the Governance Division to the People and Performance Division
The People and Performance Division was further renamed Workforce Capability and Governance Division on 22 July 2011.

Treasury Directorate
The Treasury Directorate was renamed from the Department of Treasury on 17 May 2011. It was headed by the Treasurer, and provided strategic financial and economic advice and services to the ACT Government with the aim of improving the Territory’s financial position and economic management.

Economic Development Directorate
The Economic Development Directorate was a brand new directorate formed on 17 May 2011, bringing together elements of ACT Government operations (ACT Public Service) that have a focus on economic activity which included working with the business community in relation to economic development and business support programs, the design and delivery of the government's land release program, tourism and events and sport and recreation.

Mergers
On 10 November 2012, the Treasury Directorate along with its Finance and Budget and Investment division and Economics division were merged into the CMCD, which was renamed Chief Minister and Treasury Directorate (CMTD). This started the history of the Chief Minister and Treasury streams within the directorate.

On 7 July 2014, further administrative arrangements resulted in:
 formation of Chief Minister, Treasury and Economic Development Directorate (CMTEDD) from the merger of the CMTD, the Commerce and Works Directorate and the Economic Development Directorate (EDD)
 artsACT, community concessions and community facilities were transferred from the Community Services Directorate into the CMTEDD 
 ACT Property Group was transferred from the Territory and Municipal Services Directorate (TAMS) into the CMTEDD

Structure
The directorate is split into two streams, with following divisions and functions:
 Chief Minister stream
 Office of the Head of Service
 Policy and Cabinet
 Chief Financial Officer
 Communications and Engagement
 Economic Development
 Workforce Capability and Governance
 Access Canberra
 Corporate
 Chief Digital Officer
 Treasury stream
 Economic, Budget and Industrial Relations
 Finance and Budget
 Revenue Management
 Workplace Safety and industrial Relations
Economic and Financial
 Commercial Services and Infrastructure
 Shared Services
 Procurement ACT
 Property and Venues
 ACT Insurance Authority (ACTIA)

, the Chief Minister stream is headed by the Head of service and Director-General, Kathy Leigh, while the Treasury stream is headed by the Under Treasurer, David Nicol.

The two streams report to the following ministers:
 ACT Chief Minister, currently Andrew Barr
Treasurer, currently Andrew Barr
Minister for Climate Action, currently Andrew Barr
Minister for Economic Development, currently Andrew Barr
Minister for Tourism, currently Andrew Barr
 Minister for Sport and Recreation, currently Yvette Berry
Minister for Industrial Relations and Workplace Safety, currently Mick Gentleman
Minister for Skills, currently Chris Steel
Special Minister of State, currently Chris Steel
Assistant Minister for Economic Development, currently Tara Cheyne
 Minister for the Arts, currently Tara Cheyne
Minister for Business and Better Regulation, currently Tara Cheyne

References

External links
Chief Minister, Treasury and Economic Development Development website

Government agencies of the Australian Capital Territory